Association Sportive du Lycée Adoum Dallah or simply AS Lycée Adoum Dallah, known also as ASLAD for a short is a football (soccer) club from Chad based in Moundou.

Achievements
Chad Cup: 1
 2013.

Performance in CAF competitions
CAF Confederation Cup: 1 appearance
2014 –

CAF Cup: 1 appearance
 2000 – withdrew in First Round

References

External links
Team profile – The Biggest Football Archive of the World

Football clubs in Chad
Moundou